Giacinto de Popoli (died 1682) was an Italian painter of the Baroque period, active near his natal city of Orta di Atella in the Province of Caserta. He was a pupil of Massimo Stanzioni.

References

1682 deaths
17th-century Neapolitan people
17th-century Italian painters
Italian male painters
Painters from Naples
Italian Baroque painters
1631 births